Max Poon Ka Ming (born 30 July 1985) is a former Hong Kong professional footballer who played as a right back.

References

External links
 Yau Yee Football League profile

Living people
1985 births
Hong Kong footballers
Association football defenders
Hong Kong First Division League players
Hong Kong Premier League players
Hong Kong FC players